Vesa Hanski (born September 13, 1973 in Turku) is a retired male butterfly and freestyle swimmer from Finland, who competed in two consecutive Summer Olympics for his native country, starting in 1992.

References
sports-reference

1973 births
Living people
Olympic swimmers of Finland
Finnish male freestyle swimmers
Finnish male butterfly swimmers
Swimmers at the 1992 Summer Olympics
Swimmers at the 1996 Summer Olympics
Sportspeople from Turku